Sabiote is a municipality in the province of Jaén, Spain.

References

Municipalities in the Province of Jaén (Spain)